"Déjà Vu" is a song by English rock musician and former Pink Floyd member Roger Waters, and the second track on his fourth solo studio album, Is This the Life We Really Want? It was released as a single on 8 May 2017, with the album being released on 2 June 2017, by Columbia Records. It was previously known as "Lay Down Jerusalem (If I Had Been God)" when played live before single's official release. Waters reintroduced the 'Lay Down Jerusalem' refrain in live performances dating from the 2018 Oceania leg of his Us + Them Tour.

Track listing

Personnel
 Roger Waters – vocals, acoustic guitar, bass guitar

References

2017 songs
2017 singles
Roger Waters songs
Songs written by Roger Waters
Song recordings produced by Nigel Godrich
Columbia Records singles